Tway is a hamlet in the Rural Municipality of Invergordon No. 430 in the Canadian province of Saskatchewan. The Tway National Wildlife Area is northeast of the community.

Demographics 

References

Designated places in Saskatchewan
Invergordon No. 430, Saskatchewan
Organized hamlets in Saskatchewan
Division No. 15, Saskatchewan